The Edmonton Radial Railway Society (ERRS) restores and operates historic streetcars in Fort Edmonton Park and across the High Level Bridge. It is named after the Edmonton Radial Railway, which began service in 1908 and later became Edmonton Transit Service.

History
The Edmonton Radial Railway, later known as Edmonton Transit Service, operated electric streetcars in Edmonton from 1908 until 1951. After the abandonment of streetcar service, only Streetcar #1 was retained. In 1964 it was partially restored and later was part of the 1967 Centennial Parade. During Thanksgiving weekend 1979, Streetcar #1 gave trips across the High Level bridge to celebrate Edmonton's 75th anniversary. Following this successful operation, the Edmonton Radial Railway Society was founded in 1980.

During the development of Fort Edmonton Park an agreement was reached to build streetcar tracks there. In 1981 the streetcar began running in the park. By 1984 the members of the ERRS had established regular service in the park.

Edmonton Radial Railway Streetcar #1, which started service in 1908, was the first to be restored by Edmonton Radial Railway Society volunteers. Later, Edmonton streetcars #42 and #33 were also restored. During the 100th anniversary of public transportation in Edmonton ceremonies in 2008, Edmonton Streetcar #1 was the centre piece of Churchill Square.

Heritage routes

High Level Bridge Streetcar

The High Level Bridge Streetcar is a historic streetcar ride over the High Level Bridge in Edmonton, Alberta. It travels from the Strathcona Streetcar Barn & Museum, just north of the Strathcona Farmers Market along Gateway Boulevard to Jasper Plaza (south of Jasper Avenue, between 109 Street and 110 Street) in downtown, with three intermediate stops. It operates between the Victoria Day weekend in May, and Thanksgiving weekend in October. It is operated by the Edmonton Radial Railway Society.

Starting from its southern terminus at Whyte Ave, which opened in 2022, the streetcar travels on the former CP Rail line in a north west direction. After crossing Gateway Boulevard, it stops at the Old Strathcona Streetcar Barn & Museum. Next, it passes the Calgary & Edmonton Railway Station Museum at present-day 105 Street; this is a replica of the station that was the northern anchor of the Calgary and Edmonton Railway from 1891 to 1908. After a level crossing stop at 107 Street, the streetcar goes under the Saskatchewan Drive, 109 Street, and Walterdale Hill intersection. While turning north, the middle stop is in the neighbourhood of Garneau at 90 Avenue, before getting on the High Level Bridge. After travelling high over the surface of the North Saskatchewan River, it continues over River Valley Road, and 97 Avenue, entering the Ribbon of Steel multi-use corridor. The Ribbon of Steel is a corridor designated by Alberta Infrastructure and the City of Edmonton for the preservation of streetcar rail in Edmonton, and to provide a running/cycling path between 109 Street and 110 Street, from 97 Avenue to Jasper Avenue. The first stop on the Ribbon of Steel is the Government Centre stop, with walking access to the Government Centre station, and the Legislature grounds. The northern terminus of the High Level Bridge Streetcar ride is at Jasper Plaza, just south of Jasper Avenue.  The streetcar system that existed in Edmonton until 1951 ran through the downtown core, including down Jasper Avenue. The former rail line continued north, where 110 Street is now, to the Old CN Rail yard (north of 104 Avenue).

During summer festivals, such as the Fringe, service is extended to accommodate the increase in crowds.

Fort Edmonton Park

There are turning loops at each terminus, near the park entrance and at Egge's barn.

Within the park, a replica of the south side streetcar barn has been constructed to house restored streetcars and the ERRS maintenance and restoration workshop.

Collection
The ERRS service operates its services using a collection of heritage streetcars. Some have been fully restored while most are in various stages of restoration.

References

External links

Heritage railways in Alberta
Passenger rail transport in Alberta
Railway museums in Alberta
Streetcars in Canada
1980 establishments in Alberta
Tourist attractions in Edmonton
Organizations established in 1980
Street railways in Alberta